The Philippines competed at the 1996 Summer Olympics in Atlanta, United States. The 12-athlete delegation to the 1996 Atlanta Olympics competed in athletics, badminton, boxing, equestrian, shooting and swimming. This was the last Olympic games where the Philippines brought home a medal, a silver by boxer Mansueto Velasco, until weightlifter Hidilyn Diaz won a silver medal at the 2016 Summer Olympics, and eventually the country's first gold medal at the 2020 Summer Olympics.

Medalists

Athletics

Men's Marathon

Women's Long Jump

Badminton

Boxing

Equestrian

Shooting

Men's Trap

Men's Double Trap

Swimming

Men

Women

References

Philippine Sports Commission

Nations at the 1996 Summer Olympics
1996
Summer Olympics